Sierra Nevada, also known as Sierra Nevada de Lagunas Bravas, is a major ignimbrite-lava dome complex which lies in both Chile and Argentina in one of the most remote parts of the Central Andes.

Activity in the complex started in Argentina and formed two stratovolcanoes. It covers a total area of 225 km2. Radiometric dating has yielded ages of 1.7 ± 0.4 to 0.431 ± 0.012 million years ago, a lava flow from the neighbouring Azufrera Los Cuyanos volcano that is sometimes considered part of Sierra Nevada is 140,000 years old. Together with Cerro el Condor and Peinado it forms the Culampaja line, a line of volcanoes that reaches Cerro Blanco. Strong seismic attenuation is observed beneath Sierra Nevada. Hydrothermally altered rocks in Sierra Nevada may be the source of sulfate and arsenic in the Juncalito and Negro rivers, and heat sources for regional hot springs. The snowline in the area lies at  altitude at Cumbre del Laudo.

First Ascent 
Sierra Nevada's main summit was one of the last 6000 metre peaks climbed in the Andes. It was thought that its secondary summit, which sits on the border, was the highest. New measurements however show that the main summit is entirely in Argentina, 2.6 kilometres east. The complex has 9 main summits.

See also
 List of volcanoes in Argentina
 List of volcanoes in Chile

Notes

References

Sources
  (in Spanish; also includes volcanoes of Argentina, Bolivia, and Peru)

Volcanoes of Atacama Region
Stratovolcanoes of Chile
Complex volcanoes
Subduction volcanoes
Volcanoes of Argentina
Mountains of Chile
Mountains of Argentina
Polygenetic volcanoes
Argentina–Chile border
International mountains of South America
Landforms of Catamarca Province
Six-thousanders of the Andes